Port Augusta West is a suburb of Port Augusta, South Australia.

However, it has a separate early colonial history to Port Augusta, because it is on the Eyre Peninsula, while the rest of Port Augusta is on the east side of Spencer Gulf. It was not until 1926 that a bridge was built across the head of the Spencer Gulf to connect them, replacing a punt.

The Corporate Town of Port Augusta West was gazetted on 6 October 1887, and only merged into the Corporate Town of Port Augusta on 28 April 1932.

Port Augusta West contains the junction of the Eyre Highway (to Eyre Peninsula and Western Australia), Stuart Highway (to the Far North and Northern Territory), and Augusta Highway (to Adelaide).

Location, description and land use

Port Augusta West is the only part of Port Augusta that is located on the western side of Spencer Gulf on the Eyre Peninsula.

Port Augusta West consists of an urban area on the east coast of the Eyre Peninsula, immediately west of the centre of Port Augusta. It is dissected by the Augusta Highway, which branches in the middle of the suburb, to become the Stuart Highway which heads north, and the Eyre Highway which heads west. The Whyalla-Port Augusta railway line passes to the north and west of the suburb’s urban area.

The suburb is mainly residential on the eastern side of the suburb. The area between the Eyre Highway and the Stuart Highway on the west side of the suburb’s built area is zoned for industrial use. The Port Augusta Airport is located to the south end of the suburb and is separated from the residential area by open space and a “vegetation buffer”.

The suburb includes the Port Augusta Golf Club and Port Augusta West Primary School. The suburb also contains the Australian Arid Lands Botanic Garden, West Side Foreshore, Westside Lookout Tower, Rotary Park, Northey Crescent and Sid Welk Park.

The historic Port Augusta West Water Tower in Mitchell Terrace is listed on the South Australian Heritage Register.

Governance
Port Augusta West is located within the federal division of Grey, the state electoral district of Stuart, and the local government area of the City of Port Augusta. The suburb is also located within the South Australian Government region of the Far North.

Climate
Port Augusta West has a warm desert climate (Köppen climate classification BWk).

See also
List of cities and towns in South Australia

References

Towns in South Australia
Eyre Peninsula
Far North (South Australia)